Sanaye Giti Pasand Isfahan Volleyball Club was an Iranian professional volleyball team based in Isfahan, Iran. The team is owned by Sanaye Giti Pasand Company . They compete in the Iranian Volleyball Super League.
Giti Pasand was dissolved after Presence one year in volleyball Super League.

Notable former players 
  Shane Alexander
  Mehdi Bazargard
  Mohammad Mousavi
  Farhad Zarif
  Mojtaba Shaban

Honors 
 National
 Naghshe Jahan Cup:
 Champions (1): 2011

External links 
 Official website
 Giti pasand Fan Club website

References 

Iranian volleyball clubs
Sport in Isfahan